An axion is a hypothetical elementary particle.

Axion may also refer to:
 Axion (mythology), the name of two mythological figures
 Axion (brand), a brand of dishwashing liquid product marketed by Colgate-Palmolive
 Axion (beetle), a genus of lady beetles
 "Axion Estin"  or "It is Truly Meet", a hymn of the Eastern Orthodox and Greek-Catholic Churches
 Montreal Axion, a Canadian hockey team
 Cable Axion, a Canadian cable television distributor and Internet service provider
 Claas Axion, a French tractor
Axxion, a guitar model produced by ESP Dave Mustaine

See also
 Action (disambiguation)
 Axon (disambiguation)
 Axiom (disambiguation)
 Acxiom (disambiguation)